Hill Valley may refer to:

 Hill Valley (Back to the Future), the fictional town in the Back to the Future film series
 Hill Valley, the fictional town in the animated cartoon series The Oblongs
 Hill Valley Gardens, the fictional home town of the traveling family in the stop-motion series Glenn Martin, DDS
 Red Hill Valley, a valley in eastern and south-eastern Hamilton, Ontario, Canada
 Red Hill Valley Parkway, a municipal expressway running through Hamilton, Ontario, Canada